Weight loss, in the context of medicine, health, or physical fitness, refers to a reduction of the total body mass, by a mean loss of fluid, body fat (adipose tissue), or lean mass (namely bone mineral deposits, muscle, tendon, and other connective tissue). Weight loss can either occur unintentionally because of malnourishment or an underlying disease, or from a conscious effort to improve an actual or perceived overweight or obese state.  "Unexplained" weight loss that is not caused by reduction in calorific intake or exercise is called cachexia and may be a symptom of a serious medical condition.

Intentional 
Intentional weight loss is the loss of total body mass as a result of efforts to improve fitness and health, or to change appearance through slimming. Weight loss is the main treatment for obesity, and there is substantial evidence this can prevent progression from prediabetes to type 2 diabetes with a 7-10% weight loss and manage cardiometabolic health for diabetic people with a 5-15% weight loss.

Weight loss in individuals who are overweight or obese can reduce health risks, increase fitness, and may delay the onset of diabetes. It could reduce pain and increase movement in people with osteoarthritis of the knee. Weight loss can lead to a reduction in hypertension (high blood pressure), however whether this reduces hypertension-related harm is unclear. Weight loss is achieved by adopting a lifestyle in which fewer calories are consumed than are expended. Depression, stress or boredom may contribute to weight increase, and in these cases, individuals are advised to seek medical help. A 2010 study found that dieters who got a full night's sleep lost more than twice as much fat as sleep-deprived dieters. Though hypothesized that supplementation of vitamin D may help, studies do not support this. The majority of dieters regain weight over the long term. According to the UK National Health Service and the Dietary Guidelines for Americans, those who achieve and manage a healthy weight do so most successfully by being careful to consume just enough calories to meet their needs, and being physically active.

For weight loss to be permanent, changes in diet and lifestyle must be permanent as well. There is evidence that counseling or exercise alone do not result in weight loss, whereas dieting alone results in meaningful long-term weight loss, and a combination of dieting and exercise provides the best results. Meal replacements, orlistat, a very-low-calorie diet, and primary care intensive medical interventions can also support meaningful weight loss.

Techniques

Diet and exercise 
The least intrusive weight loss methods, and those most often recommended, are adjustments to eating patterns and increased physical activity, generally in the form of exercise. The World Health Organization recommends that people combine a reduction of processed foods high in saturated fats, sugar and salt, and reduced caloric intake with an increase in physical activity. Both long-term exercise programs and anti-obesity medications reduce abdominal fat volume.
Self-monitoring of diet, exercise, and weight are beneficial strategies for weight loss, particularly early in weight loss programs. Research indicates that those who log their foods about three times per day and about 20 times per month are more likely to achieve clinically significant weight loss.

Weight loss depends on maintaining a negative energy balance and not the type of macronutrients (such as carbohydrate) consumed. High protein diets have shown greater efficacy in the short term for people eating ad libitum due to increased thermogenesis and satiety.

Medications 

Other methods of weight loss include use of anti-obesity drugs that decrease appetite, block fat absorption, or reduce stomach volume. Obesity has been resistant to drug-based therapies, with a 2021 review stating that existing medications are "often delivering insufficient efficacy and dubious safety".

Bariatric surgery 
Bariatric surgery may be indicated in cases of severe obesity.  Two common bariatric surgical procedures are gastric bypass and gastric banding. Both can be effective at limiting the intake of food energy by reducing the size of the stomach, but as with any surgical procedure both come with their own risks that should be considered in consultation with a physician.

Weight loss industry 
There is a substantial market for products which claim to make weight loss easier, quicker, cheaper, more reliable, or less painful. These include books, DVDs, CDs, cremes, lotions, pills, rings and earrings, body wraps, body belts and other materials, fitness centers, clinics, personal coaches, weight loss groups, and food products and supplements. Dietary supplements, though widely used, are not considered a healthy option for weight loss, and have no clinical evidence of efficacy. Herbal products have not been shown to be effective.

In 2008, between US$33 billion and $55 billion was spent annually in the US on weight-loss products and services, including medical procedures and pharmaceuticals, with weight-loss centers taking between 6 and 12 percent of total annual expenditure. Over $1.6 billion per year was spent on weight-loss supplements. About 70 percent of Americans' dieting attempts are of a self-help nature.

In Western Europe, sales of weight-loss products, excluding prescription medications, topped €1,25 billion (£900 million/$1.4 billion) in 2009.

The scientific soundness of commercial diets by commercial weight management organizations varies widely, being previously non-evidence-based, so there is only limited evidence supporting their use, because of high attrition rates. Commercial diets result in modest weight loss in the long term, with similar results regardless of the brand, and similarly to non-commercial diets and standard care. Comprehensive diet programs, providing counseling and targets for calorie intake, are more efficient than dieting without guidance ("self-help"), although the evidence is very limited. The National Institute for Health and Care Excellence devised a set of essential criteria to be met by commercial weight management organizations to be approved.

Unintentional

Characteristics 
Unintentional weight loss may result from loss of body fats, loss of body fluids, muscle atrophy, or a combination of these. It is generally regarded as a medical problem when at least 10% of a person's body weight has been lost in six months or 5% in the last month. Another criterion used for assessing weight that is too low is the body mass index (BMI). However, even lesser amounts of weight loss can be a cause for serious concern in a frail elderly person.

Unintentional weight loss can occur because of an inadequately nutritious diet relative to a person's energy needs (generally called malnutrition). Disease processes, changes in metabolism, hormonal changes, medications or other treatments, disease- or treatment-related dietary changes, or reduced appetite associated with a disease or treatment can also cause unintentional weight loss. Poor nutrient utilization can lead to weight loss, and can be caused by fistulae in the gastrointestinal tract, diarrhea, drug-nutrient interaction, enzyme depletion and muscle atrophy.

Continuing weight loss may deteriorate into wasting, a vaguely defined condition called cachexia. Cachexia differs from starvation in part because it involves a systemic inflammatory response. It is associated with poorer outcomes. In the advanced stages of progressive disease, metabolism can change so that they lose weight even when they are getting what is normally regarded as adequate nutrition and the body cannot compensate. This leads to a condition called anorexia cachexia syndrome (ACS) and additional nutrition or supplementation is unlikely to help. Symptoms of weight loss from ACS include severe weight loss from muscle rather than body fat, loss of appetite and feeling full after eating small amounts, nausea, anemia, weakness and fatigue.

Serious weight loss may reduce quality of life, impair treatment effectiveness or recovery, worsen disease processes and be a risk factor for high mortality rates. Malnutrition can affect every function of the human body, from the cells to the most complex body functions, including:
 immune response;
 wound healing;
 muscle strength (including respiratory muscles);
 renal capacity and depletion leading to water and electrolyte disturbances;
 thermoregulation; and
 menstruation.

Malnutrition can lead to vitamin and other deficiencies and to inactivity, which in turn may pre-dispose to other problems, such as pressure sores. Unintentional weight loss can be the characteristic leading to diagnosis of diseases such as cancer and type 1 diabetes. In the UK, up to 5% of the general population is underweight, but more than 10% of those with lung or gastrointestinal diseases and who have recently had surgery. According to data in the UK using the Malnutrition Universal Screening Tool ('MUST'), which incorporates unintentional weight loss, more than 10% of the population over the age of 65 is at risk of malnutrition. A high proportion (10–60%) of hospital patients are also at risk, along with a similar proportion in care homes.

Causes

Disease-related 
Disease-related malnutrition can be considered in four categories:

Weight loss issues related to specific diseases include:
 As chronic obstructive pulmonary disease (COPD) advances, about 35% of patients experience severe weight loss called pulmonary cachexia, including diminished muscle mass. Around 25% experience moderate to severe weight loss, and most others have some weight loss. Greater weight loss is associated with poorer prognosis. Theories about contributing factors include appetite loss related to reduced activity, additional energy required for breathing, and the difficulty of eating with dyspnea (labored breathing).
 Cancer, a very common and sometimes fatal cause of unexplained (idiopathic) weight loss. About one-third of unintentional weight loss cases are secondary to malignancy. Cancers to suspect in patients with unexplained weight loss include gastrointestinal, prostate, hepatobiliary (hepatocellular carcinoma, pancreatic cancer), ovarian, hematologic or lung malignancies.
 People with HIV often experience weight loss, and it is associated with poorer outcomes. Wasting syndrome is an AIDS-defining condition.
 Gastrointestinal disorders are another common cause of unexplained weight loss – in fact they are the most common non-cancerous cause of idiopathic weight loss. Possible gastrointestinal etiologies of unexplained weight loss include: celiac disease, peptic ulcer disease, inflammatory bowel disease (crohn's disease and ulcerative colitis), pancreatitis, gastritis, diarrhea, chronic mesenteric ischemia and many other GI conditions.
 Infection. Some infectious diseases can cause weight loss. Fungal illnesses, endocarditis, many parasitic diseases, AIDS, and some other subacute or occult infections may cause weight loss.
 Renal disease. Patients who have uremia often have poor or absent appetite, vomiting and nausea. This can cause weight loss.
 Cardiac disease. Cardiovascular disease, especially congestive heart failure, may cause unexplained weight loss.
 Connective tissue disease
 Oral, taste or dental problems (including infections) can reduce nutrient intake leading to weight loss.

Therapy-related 
Medical treatment can directly or indirectly cause weight loss, impairing treatment effectiveness and recovery that can lead to further weight loss in a vicious cycle. Many patients will be in pain and have a loss of appetite after surgery. Part of the body's response to surgery is to direct energy to wound healing, which increases the body's overall energy requirements. Surgery affects nutritional status indirectly, particularly during the recovery period, as it can interfere with wound healing and other aspects of recovery. Surgery directly affects nutritional status if a procedure permanently alters the digestive system. Enteral nutrition (tube feeding) is often needed. However a policy of 'nil by mouth' for all gastrointestinal surgery has not been shown to benefit, with some weak evidence suggesting it might hinder recovery. Early post-operative nutrition is a part of Enhanced Recovery After Surgery protocols. These protocols also include carbohydrate loading in the 24 hours before surgery, but earlier nutritional interventions have not been shown to have a significant impact.

Social conditions 
Social conditions such as poverty, social isolation and inability to get or prepare preferred foods can cause unintentional weight loss, and this may be particularly common in older people. Nutrient intake can also be affected by culture, family and belief systems. Ill-fitting dentures and other dental or oral health problems can also affect adequacy of nutrition.

Loss of hope, status or social contact and spiritual distress can cause depression, which may be associated with reduced nutrition, as can fatigue.

Myths 
Some popular beliefs attached to weight loss have been shown to either have less effect on weight loss than commonly believed or are actively unhealthy. According to Harvard Health, the idea of metabolic rate being the "key to weight" is "part truth and part myth" as while metabolism does affect weight loss, external forces such as diet and exercise have an equal effect. They also commented that the idea of changing one's rate of metabolism is under debate. Diet plans in fitness magazines are also often believed to be effective but may actually be harmful by limiting the daily intake of important calories and nutrients which can be detrimental depending on the person and are even capable of driving individuals away from weight loss.

Health effects 

Obesity increases health risks, including diabetes, cancer, cardiovascular disease, high blood pressure, and non-alcoholic fatty liver disease, to name a few. Reduction of obesity lowers those risks. A 1-kg loss of body weight has been associated with an approximate 1-mm Hg drop in blood pressure. Intentional weight loss is associated with cognitive performance improvements in overweight and obese individuals.

See also 
 Anorexia
 Cigarette smoking for weight loss
 Dieting
 Physical exercise
 Weight gain

References

External links 

 
 Health benefits of losing weight By IQWiG at PubMed Health
 Weight-control Information Network   U.S. National Institutes of Health
 Nutrition in cancer care By NCI at PubMed Health
 Unintentional weight loss

 
Dietetics
Obesity
Symptoms and signs